Rafolče ( or) is a village in the Municipality of Lukovica in the eastern part of the Upper Carniola region of Slovenia.

Name
Rafolče was attested in written sources in 1332 as Rauelsdorf (and as Raffolstorff in 1351, Rapholczdorff in 1362, and Raffelsdorf in 1458). Locally, the village is known as Rahovče. The name is originally a plural demonym derived from the Old High German name Rapholt and thus means 'residents of Rapholt's village'.

Church

The local church is dedicated to Saint Catherine.

References

External links

Rafolče on Geopedia

Populated places in the Municipality of Lukovica